The C3 is a bi-level coach railroad car built by Kawasaki. Ordered by the Metropolitan Transportation Authority for use on the Long Island Rail Road (LIRR), the cars began to enter revenue service in 1997. The rail cars are pulled and pushed by EMD DE30AC and DM30AC dual-mode (diesel and electric) locomotives. The C3 cars are powered by 480 V AC head-end power supplied from the locomotive.

Description 
There are three types of C3 cars: cab car with toilet (C Car), trailer car (T Car), and trailer car with toilet (T/T car). The C car is normally at the opposite end of a consist from the locomotive.

Unlike the LIRR's electric multiple unit rail cars which use fully automatic couplers which make all connections between the rail vehicles (mechanical, air brake, and electrical) without human intervention, the C3 use more traditional connectors. Cars are equipped with H type tightlock couplers, two air hose connectors, and MU, COMM, and 480 V 3-phase AC head-end power electrical cables.

The C3s are the first trains on the LIRR to feature automated announcements with LED destination sign displays, announcing the current station, the following station, and destinations along the routes. However, over the years of service, the components often fell into disrepair, forcing the train crew to make announcements instead.

Additionally, despite being based largely on the C1s, the C3s are not mechanically compatible with their C1 prototypes.

Due to their height, the C3 coaches cannot fit through the 63rd Street Tunnel, and are thus unable to serve Grand Central Madison station.

History 
The C3s were ordered following the successful experiment of using the C1 railcars on the LIRR's non-electrified branches, to replace the aging P72 and P75 coaches which were in use at the time in diesel territory. Delivery of the C3s was delayed for over a year due to production problems.

Design 
The C3s design was largely on their C1 prototypes, with a few key differences. Seating inside the C3 cars is arranged as 2–2 abreast, with some rows being 2–1 abreast. The lack of a middle seat contrasts with the seating onboard the C1 prototypes; the C1s had 3–2 abreast seating, which received poor feedback from passengers. The C3s also feature technological upgrades, including the LED destination sign displays and automated announcements.

As the C3 cars are designed to use high-level platforms, passengers enter the train on either end of the railcar on a midlevel, entering a vestibule, thence climb or descend a short flight of steps to the upper and lower seating levels; accessible seating is available on the entrance (middle) level. The cars can accommodate two wheelchairs. The seats are cantilevered, mainly to make cleaning easier.

The doors on the sides of the railcars are single-leaf doors, which slide open.

See also 
 C1 (railcar)
 M1/M3 (railcar)
 M7 (railcar)
 DE/DM30AC

References

External links 
 
 
 LONG ISLAND RAIL ROAD COMMUTER BI-LEVEL
 For the overseas markets | Rolling Stock | Kawasaki Heavy Industries, Ltd. KHI

Rail passenger cars of the United States
Long Island Rail Road
Double-decker rail vehicles
Kawasaki rolling stock